Gary W. Bauer is an American politician from Idaho. Bauer was a Republican member of Idaho House of Representatives.

Early life 
On June 3, 1936, Bauer was born in Mackinaw City, Michigan.

Career 
On November 5, 2002, Bauer won the election unopposed and became a Republican member of Idaho House of Representatives for District 11, seat B.

On May 25, 2004 as an incumbent, Bauer sought for a seat in District 11, seat B unsuccessfully in the Republican Primary for Idaho House of Representatives. Bauer was defeated by Carlos Bilbao with 50.43% of the votes. Bauer lost by 43 votes. On May 23, 2006, Bauer sought for a seat in District 11, seat B unsuccessfully. Bauer was defeated by Carlos Bilbao with 55.7% of the votes. On May 27, 2008, Bauer sought for a seat in District 11, seat A unsuccessfully. Bauer was defeated by Steven Thayn with 38.3% of the votes.

Personal life 
Bauer's wife is Mary Lou Bauer. They have three children. Bauer and his family live in Nampa, Idaho.

References

External links 
 Gary Bauer at ballotpedia.org
Gary W. Bauer at baltimoresun.com (October 3. 1990)

1936 births
Living people
Republican Party members of the Idaho House of Representatives